Adam Rich (October 12, 1968 – January 7, 2023) was an American actor. He was best known for his portrayal of Nicholas Bradford, the youngest son on the television series Eight Is Enough, which ran for five seasons (1977–1981). Known for his pageboy haircut, Rich's character on the show led him to be known as "America's little brother."

Personal life 
Rich was born on October 12, 1968, the son of Francine and Rob Rich. His family was Jewish. Growing up as a child actor,  Rich lived in Granada Hills, Los Angeles, with his parents and younger brother. The family briefly lived in Florida where he learned how to act at the local gym. He was active in sports, including baseball, football, bicycle riding, skateboarding, and swimming. He also had an interest in drawing. At age 14, he tried smoking marijuana, and at 17, in 1986, he dropped out of high school. He almost died of a valium overdose in 1989. In 1991, he was arrested and charged with attempted burglary of a pharmacy.

In 1996, there was a media hoax that Rich had been murdered; the story was published in the San Francisco-based magazine Might, with Rich's consent. Might writer Dave Eggers included the incident in his memoir A Heartbreaking Work of Staggering Genius.

In 2002, Rich was arrested for driving under the influence (DUI). He was in drug rehabilitation at least three times.

As of 2013, he occasionally made personal appearances and marketed script ideas for TV shows and films.

Career
Rich won the role of Nicholas at the age of eight. After Eight Is Enough, he had roles in Irwin Allen's short-lived 1981 TV series Code Red on ABC and the 1983 sitcom Gun Shy on CBS.

Rich made guest appearances on television series including The Love Boat, CHiPs, Fantasy Island, The Six Million Dollar Man, St. Elsewhere, and Baywatch. He also did voice work on the cartoon series Dungeons & Dragons, along with Eight Is Enough co-star Willie Aames.

Rich appeared in TV commercials for Betty Crocker Snackin' Cake and Nabisco's Wheatsworth crackers.

Death
Rich died in his Los Angeles home on January 7, 2023, at the age of 54. The cause of death was not disclosed.

Filmography

References

External links 
 

1968 births
2023 deaths
American male child actors
American male film actors
American male television actors
Jewish American actors
Jewish American male actors
People from Granada Hills, Los Angeles
Male actors from Los Angeles
Male actors from New York City
20th-century American male actors